The 1794 Vermont gubernatorial election for Governor of Vermont took place throughout September, and resulted in the re-election of Governor Thomas Chittenden to a one-year term.

The Vermont General Assembly met in Rutland on October 9. The Vermont House of Representatives appointed a committee to examine the votes of the freemen of Vermont for governor, lieutenant governor, treasurer, and members of the governor's council. The body met to count the votes on the morning of October 10.

In the race for governor, Thomas Chittenden, who had been governor from 1778 to 1789, and again starting in 1790, was re-elected for a one-year term. The freemen also re-elected Samuel Mattocks as treasurer, his eighth one-year term.

In the election for lieutenant governor, no candidate received a majority. In keeping with the Vermont Constitution, the Assembly was required to choose. On the afternoon of October 10, the body elected Jonathan Hunt. Hunt declined the appointment and the Assembly adjourned. On the morning of October 11, Hunt agreed to accept the position and took the oath of office.

The names of candidates and balloting totals for statewide offices were not recorded. According to a contemporary newspaper article, Chittenden won by a majority of several hundred votes.

Results

References

Vermont gubernatorial elections
Gubernatorial
1794 elections in North America
Vermont